The 2020–21 network television schedule for the five major English commercial broadcast networks in Canada covers primetime hours from September 2020 through August 2021. The schedule is followed by a list per network of returning series, new series, and series cancelled after the 2019–20 television season, for Canadian, American and other series. CBC was first to announce its fall schedule on May 27, 2020, followed by Citytv on June 22, and CTV and Global on June 23. CTV was first to announce its winter schedule on December 1, followed by Global on December 16 and the CBC on December 17, 2020. As in the past, the commercial networks' announcements come shortly after they have had a chance to buy Canadian rights to new American series. CTV 2 is not included on Saturday as it normally only schedules encore programming in primetime on Saturdays.

Legend
 Light blue indicates local programming.
 Grey indicates encore programming.
 Blue-grey indicates news programming.
 Light green indicates sporting events/coverage.
 Light purple indicates movies. 
 Red indicates Canadian content shows, which is programming that originated in Canada.

 Light yellow indicates the current schedule.

Schedule
 New series to Canadian television are highlighted in bold.
 All times given are in Canadian Eastern Time and Pacific Time (except for some live events or specials, including most sports, which are given in Eastern Time). Subtract one hour for Central time for most programs (excluding CBC). Airtimes may vary in the Atlantic and Mountain times and do not necessarily align with U.S. stations in the Mountain time zone. Add one half-hour to Atlantic Time schedule for Newfoundland time. (See also: Effects of time zones on North American broadcasting)

Sunday

Monday

Tuesday

Wednesday

Thursday

Friday

Saturday

By network

CBC

Returning series:
 Baroness von Sketch Show
 Battle of the Blades
 Burden of Truth
 Catastrophe
 Coroner
 Diggstown
 Family Feud Canada
 The Fifth Estate
 Frankie Drake Mysteries
 The Great Canadian Baking Show
 The Great British Baking Show
 Halifax Comedy Fest
 Heartland
 Just for Laughs: Galas
 Kim's Convenience
 Marketplace
 Murdoch Mysteries
 The National
 The Nature of Things
 Pure
 Still Standing
 TallBoyz
 22 Minutes
 Workin' Moms
 You Can't Ask That

New series:
 Anyone's Game
 Arctic Vets
 Enslaved
 Pretty Hard Cases
 The Sounds
 Trickster
 War of the Worlds

Not returning from 2019–20:
 Anne
 Back in Time for Winter
 The Detectives
 Endlings (moved to CBC Gem)
 Find Me in Paris (moved to CBC Gem)
 Fortunate Son
 Fridge Wars
 In the Making
 Northern Rescue
 The Oland Murder
 Schitt's Creek
 Wild Bill

Citytv

Returning series:
 A Million Little Things
 American Idol (moved from CTV)
 America's Got Talent
 The Bachelor
 Bachelor in Paradise USA
 The Bachelorette
 Beat Shazam
 Black-ish
 Bless the Harts
 Bob's Burgers
 Brooklyn Nine-Nine
 Card Sharks
 Celebrity Family Feud 
 Chicago Fire
 Chicago Med
 Chicago P.D.
 Dancing with the Stars
 Duncanville
 Fall in Love Fridays
 Family Guy
 Hell's Kitchen
 Hudson & Rex
 Manifest
 Mixed-ish
 Mom
 Press Your Luck
 The Simpsons

New series
 Capital One College Bowl
 The Chase
 The Great North
 Kenan
 Law & Order: Organized Crime
 Mr. Mayor
 The Republic of Sarah
 Young Rock

Not returning from 2019–20:
 The Bachelor: The Greatest Seasons- Ever!
 The Bachelor Presents: Listen to Your Heart
 The Baker and the Beauty
 Bluff City Law
 Council of Dads
 Four Weddings and a Funeral
 Lincoln Rhyme: Hunt for the Bone Collector
 Perfect Harmony
 Vagrant Queen

CTV/CTV 2

Returning series:
 9-1-1: Lone Star
 All Rise
 The Amazing Race USA (returned from 2018–19)
 American Housewife
 American Ninja Warrior
 Blue Bloods
 Bob Hearts Abishola
 The Conners
 Etalk
 For Life
 The Good Doctor
 Grey's Anatomy
 Holey Moley (moved from Global)
 Jann
 L.A.'s Finest
 Law & Order: Special Victims Unit
 Love Island
 Magnum P.I.
 Making It
 The Masked Singer
 MasterChef Canada (returned from 2018–19)
 MasterChef USA (returned from 2018–19)
 Mental Samurai (moved from Citytv)
 The $100,000 Pyramid
 The Resident
 The Rookie
 Shark Tank
 Station 19
 This Is Us
 W5
 Who Wants to Be a Millionaire
 The Voice
 Young Sheldon

New series:
 B Positive
 Big Sky
 Call Me Kat
 The Celebrity Dating Game
 Filthy Rich
 Holmes Family Effect
 Home Economics
 HouseBroken
 Kung Fu
 Lego Masters
 The Masked Dancer
 Rebel
 Superman & Lois
 Supermarket Sweep
 Weakest Link
 Wipeout

Not returning from 2019–20:
 Agents of S.H.I.E.L.D.
 Almost Family
 American Idol (moved to Citytv)
 Blindspot
 Cardinal
 Double Your Dish
 Emergence
 Flirty Dancing
 God Friended Me
 How to Get Away with Murder
 I Do, Redo
 Mary's Kitchen Crush
 The Masked Singer: After the Mask
 Stumptown
 Transplant (returned for 2021–22)
 World of Dance
 Zoey's Extraordinary Playlist

Global

Returning series:
 48 Hours (moved from CHCH/CHEK)
 60 Minutes (moved from CHCH/CHEK)
 9-1-1
 Big Brother Canada
 Big Brother USA
 The Blacklist
 Bull
 Crime Beat
 ET
 ET Canada
 FBI
 FBI: Most Wanted
 Kids Say the Darndest Things
 MacGyver
 NCIS
 NCIS: Los Angeles
 NCIS: New Orleans
 The Neighborhood
 New Amsterdam
 Nurses
 Private Eyes
 Prodigal Son
 SEAL Team
 Superstore
 S.W.A.T.
 The Unicorn

New series:
 Call Your Mother
 Clarice
 Connecting
 Departure
 The Equalizer
 Family Game Fight!
 Fantasy Island
 I Can See Your Voice
 Next
 Small Fortune
 United States of Al
 When Nature Calls with Helen Mirren

Not returning from 2019–20:
 Carol's Second Act
 Evil (moved to Paramount+)
 The Good Place
 Madam Secretary
 Modern Family
 Schooled
 Single Parents
 Survivor (returned for 2021–22)
 Tommy
 Will & Grace

Cancellations/series endings

CBC
Burden of Truth—Cancelled on March 18, 2021, after four seasons.
Frankie Drake Mysteries—Cancelled on February 28, 2021, after four seasons. The series concluded on March 8, 2021.
Kim's Convenience—It was announced on March 8, 2021, that season five would be the final season. The series concluded on April 13, 2021. 
Trickster—Cancelled on January 29, 2021.

Citytv
Bless the Harts—Cancelled on April 1, 2021, by creator Fox, after two seasons. The series concluded on June 20, 2021.
Brooklyn Nine-Nine—It was announced on February 11, 2021, by creator NBC that season eight would be the final season. The series concluded on September 16, 2021.
Mixed-ish—Cancelled on May 14, 2021, by creator ABC, after two seasons. The series concluded on May 18, 2021.
Mom—It was announced on February 17, 2021, by creator CBS that season eight would be the final season. The series concluded on May 13, 2021.
The Twilight Zone—Cancelled on February 25, 2021, by creator Paramount+, after two seasons.

CTV/CTV2
All Rise—Cancelled on May 15, 2021, by creator CBS, after two seasons. The series concluded on May 24, 2021.
American Housewife—Cancelled on May 14, 2021, by creator ABC, after five seasons.
Filthy Rich—Cancelled on October 30, 2020, by creator Fox. The series concluded on November 30, 2020.
For Life—Cancelled on May 14, 2021, by creator ABC, after two seasons.
Holmes Family Effect—The documentary miniseries was meant to run for one season only; it concluded on March 23, 2021.
L.A.'s Finest—Cancelled on October 14, 2020, by creator Charter Spectrum, after two seasons.
Rebel—Cancelled on May 14, 2021, by creator ABC. The series concluded on June 10, 2021.

Global
Call Your Mother—Cancelled on May 14, 2021, by creator ABC. The series concluded on May 19, 2021.
Connecting—Cancelled on November 2, 2020, by creator NBC.
MacGyver—It was announced on April 7, 2021, by creator CBS that season five would be the final season. The series concluded on April 30, 2021.
Manhunt: Deadly Games—The anthology series was meant to run for one season only; it concluded on November 7, 2020.
NCIS: New Orleans—It was announced on February 17, 2021, by creator CBS that season seven would be the final season. The series concluded on May 23, 2021.
Next—Cancelled on October 30, 2020, by creator Fox. The series concluded on December 22, 2020.
One Day at a Time—Cancelled on November 24, 2020, by creator Pop, after four seasons.
Prodigal Son—Cancelled on May 10, 2021, by creator Fox, after two seasons. The series concluded on May 18, 2021.
Superstore—It was announced on December 3, 2020, by creator NBC that season six would be the final season. The series concluded on March 25, 2021.
The Unicorn—Cancelled on May 15, 2021, by creator CBS, after two seasons.

Weekly ratings

See also
 2020–21 United States network television schedule

Notes

References

 
 
Canadian television schedules